Ron Stone (born 30 July 1945) is a former Australian rules footballer who played with Carlton in the Victorian Football League (VFL). Stone had three children and seven grandchildren.

Notes

External links 

Ron Stone's profile at Blueseum

1945 births
Carlton Football Club players
Living people
Australian rules footballers from Victoria (Australia)